The Institute of Plant Breeding (IPB) is a research institute of the University of the Philippines Los Baños. It is the national biotechnology research center and repository for all crops other than rice, which is handled by the Philippine Rice Research Institute.

It traces its roots to the Plant Breeding Division of the Department of Agronomy, College of Agriculture. Dr. Emil Q. Javier later spearheaded the elevation of the division to an institute, which was approved and given funding under Presidential Decree No. 729 in June 1975, with Javier also serving as the institute's first director.

Core functions
Develop new and improved varieties of dryland crops
Conduct studies in plant breeding and allied disciplines related to crop improvement
Collect, introduce, preserve, and maintain germplasm of important and potentially useful agricultural and horticultural crops
Assist other agencies in multiplying quality seeds and vegetative materials of recommended crop varieties
Promote widescale use of IPB varieties and ensure that seeds are made available to small farmers

Divisions and laboratories
Cereal Crops Division
Feed and Industrial Crops Division
Fruit and Ornamental Crops Division
Legume Crops Division
Vegetables and Special Crops Division
Plant Pathology Laboratory
Entomology Laboratory
Plant Physiology Laboratory
Extension Division
Genetics Laboratory
National Plant Genetic Resources Laboratory
Biochemistry Laboratory
Plant Cell and Tissue Culture Laboratory
National Seed Foundation

Samples of IPB research
Papaya Ringspot Virus (PSRV)-Resistant
This variety is a genetically enhanced papaya with PRSV resistance and delayed ripening trait. This trait will help reduce post-harvest losses due to spoilage which is another major problem to farmers. The first and second generation papayas had been previously subjected to polymerase chain reaction analysis, which indicated that the lines contain a copy of the PRSV coat protein gene. A third generation papaya is currently under development.

Fruit and Shoot Borer Resistant Eggplant
Initial crosses had already been made between Indian transgenic eggplants and selected Philippine varieties Mara, Mistisa, Dumaguete Long Purple, and Casino. The progeny of these crosses were then back-crossed with their Philippine variety parent in India.

Multiple Virus Resistant Tomato
The multiple virus resistant project aims to combine transgenic technologies for Cucumber Mosaic Virus with conventional resistance against Tomato Leaf Curl Virus (ToLCV) to produce commercial tomato varieties. After introgression lines and appropriate controls were supplied by IPB partners, these tomato lines were screened to identify the genome regions that confer resistance against each local ToLCV. Reliable DNA markers are also being developed for each identified genome (introgression) region.

Mutation Breeding of Philippine Avocado
Although engaged in genetic engineering, the institute also uses mutation breeding, which is an alternative method of improving crop varieties. Small portions of avocado plant tissue (embryos) were allowed to grow (embryogenic cultures) and to differentiate into somatic embryos and shoots. Some of the plant tissue cultures were subjected to gamma irradiation to facilitate mutation from the regenerated plant tissue cultures. During the irradiation, some cells were killed and those capable of regrowth were multiplied. The surviving cells were grown to produce somatic embryos and shoots. The shoots from irradiated and non-irradiated tissues were then treated in a test tube environment to promote root growth and prepare them for natural growth environment. The IPB is currently undertaking the rooting and potting out of the plantlets to enable maximum recovery. The established regenerated plants will then be transferred to the greenhouse, and finally to the field for further evaluation.

References

UPLB Institute of Plant Breeding Website
Bureau of Agricultural Research Digest
Malaysian Biotechnology Information Center
Using Biotech to Improve Philippine Avocados

Plant breeding
Agricultural research institutes
Biological research institutes
Botanical research institutes
Genetics or genomics research institutions
Research institutes in the Philippines
Plant breeding
Agricultural organizations based in the Philippines